So Fine may refer to:
So Fine (film), a 1981 movie starring Ryan O'Neal

Albums
So Fine (Ike & Tina Turner album), 1968
So Fine (Loggins and Messina album), 1975
So Fine!, a 1994 album by Finnish band Waltari

Songs
"So Fine" (Electric Light Orchestra song), 1976
"So Fine" (Guns N' Roses song), 1991
"So Fine" (Howard Johnson song), 1982
"So Fine" (Johnny Otis song), a 1959 song by The Fiestas, covered by many artists
"So Fine" (Sean Paul song), 2009
"So Fine", a 1981 song by Chic from the album Take It Off
"So Fine", a 1993 song by Mint Condition from the album From the Mint Factory